Chionodes pinguicula is a moth in the family Gelechiidae. It is found in North America, where it has been recorded from Utah, Colorado, Texas, New Mexico, Arizona, Nevada and California.

The wingspan is 13–15 mm. The forewings are light ochreous-yellowish with an irregular-triangular fuscous patch extending along the anterior half of the costa, its apex formed by black plical stigma. The first discal is black, on its oblique posterior edge rather beyond this, the lower edge triangularly indented in the middle, with small spots of pale yellowish suffusion on or near the costa before and beyond this. There is a moderate light brownish transverse fascia at two-thirds, becoming fuscous on the costa, the second discal stigma forming a black transverse mark on its anterior edge. The hindwings are light grey.

The larvae feed on Atriplex canescens.

References

Chionodes
Moths described in 1929
Moths of North America